Helmut Niedermayr (29 November 1915 in Munich – 3 April 1985 in Christiansted, US Virgin Islands) was a racing driver from Germany. He participated in one World Championship Grand Prix, on 3 August 1952, scoring no championship points.

Niedermayr finished second with Theo Helfrich at the 1952 24 Hours of Le Mans, but a few weeks later he crashed into the crowd during a race at the Grenzlandring, killing at least 13 spectators and injuring 42.

Complete Formula One World Championship results
(key)

References

1915 births
1985 deaths
German racing drivers
German Formula One drivers
AFM Formula One drivers
24 Hours of Le Mans drivers